Novacaesareala is a genus of prehistoric bird. It is known only from the fossil remains of a single partial wing of the species Novacaesareala hungerfordi. This was found in Hornerstown Formation deposits, probably from the Early Paleocene (Danian); it lived around 64 million years ago on the western shores of the Atlantic, where now is New Jersey.

It appears to have been most similar to Torotix clemensi, an even more enigmatic bird from around the same time. Consequently, it might be placed in the Torotigidae. In any case, this species (as well as Torotix) seem to have been seabirds, most probably relatives of the Procellariiformes and/or some lineage of the paraphyletic "Pelecaniformes".

Footnotes

References
  (2004): The Theropod Database: Phylogeny of taxa. Retrieved 2013-MAR-02.

Basal Neoaves
Bird genera
Paleocene birds
Paleogene birds of North America